Joseph Francis Farah (born July 6, 1954) is an American author, journalist, and editor-in-chief of the far-right conservative website WorldNetDaily (WND). Farah gained prominence for promoting conspiracy theories surrounding the suicide of Vince Foster and is a proponent of birtherism, the false conspiracy theory that Barack Obama is not a natural-born citizen of the United States.

Early years

Farah was born in Paterson, New Jersey, on July 6, 1954, to parents of Syrian and Lebanese ancestry. His father was a schoolteacher. He graduated from William Paterson University, in Wayne, New Jersey with a B.A. in Communications.

Career 

Farah worked for six years as executive news editor at the Los Angeles Herald Examiner until the paper shuttered in 1989.

On July 22, 1990, Farah became editor of The Sacramento Union. The paper had been losing up to $3 million annually, and in early 1990 it was purchased from Richard Mellon Scaife by Daniel Benvenuti Jr. and David Kassis. Farah and the paper's owners envisioned the paper as a conservative alternative to The Sacramento Bee. "We just thought the way to go was to be unabashedly conservative in our approach," explained Farah to The Washington Post. Among other things, Farah convinced Rush Limbaugh to write a daily column, which ran on "Page 1." Farah prohibited advertisement for films rated NC-17 in the newspaper.

In 1991, Farah left the Union and co-founded the Western Journalism Center. He writes a weekly print column for The Jerusalem Post which is nationally syndicated through Creators Syndicate.

He launched the online WorldNetDaily in 1997. The website has been categorized as far-right and is known for publishing unreliable or fringe material.

In April 2019, WorldNetDaily announced that Farah had suffered a stroke and would withdraw from the website's day-to-day operations until he recovers.

Promotion of conspiracy theories 

Farah gained prominence for promoting conspiracy theories surrounding the suicide of Vince Foster.

Farah is a proponent of birtherism, the conspiracy theory related to Barack Obama's status as a natural-born citizen of the United States and resultant eligibility to serve as U.S. president, stating, "It'll plague Obama throughout his presidency. It'll be a nagging issue and a sore on his administration, much like Monica Lewinsky was on Bill Clinton's presidency" and "It's not going to go away, and it will drive a wedge in an already divided public." Despite the release of Obama's notarized birth certificate abstract, he continued to promote birtherism.

Personal life 

He is married to Elizabeth Graham and is a conservative evangelical Christian. He has five children, including a daughter from a previous marriage to Judy Smagula, Alyssa Farah Griffin, who served as the Press Secretary for Vice President Mike Pence and later served as Deputy Assistant to the Secretary of Defense for Media Affairs and Press Secretary for the Department of Defense.

Books

 Collaborated with Rush Limbaugh on See, I Told You So (1994)

References

External links

 WorldNetDaily Official website
 Washington Post Online Chat Session with Joseph Farah
 

1954 births
Living people
20th-century American male writers
20th-century American non-fiction writers
20th-century evangelicals
21st-century American male writers
21st-century American non-fiction writers
21st-century evangelicals
American conspiracy theorists
American critics of Islam
American evangelicals
American male non-fiction writers
American newspaper editors
American people of Lebanese descent
American people of Syrian descent
American political writers
Evangelical writers
Lebanese evangelicals
New Jersey Republicans
Syrian Protestants
Writers from Paterson, New Jersey